Sougui is a village and seat of the commune of Ségué Iré in the Cercle of Bandiagara of the Mopti Region of southern-central Mali.

References

Populated places in Mopti Region